This is a list of Jamaican backing bands.



A
Aggrovators (The)
Amalgamated Allstars (The)
Arabs (The)

B
Baba Brooks Band (The)
Black Slate

C
Clue J & His Blues Blasters
Crystalites (The)

D
Daley Allstars (The)
Dynamites (The)
Dragonaires (The)
Duke Reid Group (The)

G
GG Allstars (The)
Gladdy's All-Stars

H
Harry J Allstars (The)
Hippy Boys (The)

I
Inner Circle

J
Jets (The) 
Joe Gibbs Allstars (The)

M
Matador Allstars (The)
Mudies Allstars (The) 
Mystic Revelation Of Rastafari (The)

P
Phil Pratt Allstars (The) 
Professionals (The)
Prince Buster Allstars (The)

R
Randy's Allstars (The)
Revolutionaries (The)
Rhythm Rulers (The)
Roots Radics (The)
Rupies Allstars (The)
Rupie Edwards Allstars (The)

S
Skatalites (The)
Sons Of Negus (The) 
Soul Brothers (The)
Soul Syndicate (The) 
Soulettes (The)
Soul Vendors (The)
Sound Dimension (The) 
Studio One Orchestra (The) 
Supersonics (The)

T
Taxi Gang

U
Upsetters (The) 2

W
Wackies Rhythm Force (The)
Wailers (The)

Z
Zap Pow

Jamaican backing bands